Harlan Pratt (born December 10, 1978) is a Canadian former professional ice hockey defenceman.

Career
Pratt was drafted by the Pittsburgh Penguins in the fifth round of the 1997 NHL Entry Draft. He has played over 900 games in eleven different leagues across North America and Europe. Pratt was selected to represent the Kölner Haie in the Deutsche Eishockey Liga's All-Star Game during the 2007–08 season.

Personal
Pratt's older brother Nolan is a former NHL defenseman who played 592 games with 5 teams from 1996 until 2008 and was a member of two Stanley Cup-winning teams (Colorado Avalanche (2000–01) and Tampa Bay Lightning (2003–04)). Nolan retired from professional hockey after the 2010-11 SM-liiga season.

Career statistics

External links
 

1978 births
Living people
Augsburger Panther players
Bridgeport Sound Tigers players
Canadian expatriate ice hockey players in Austria
Canadian expatriate ice hockey players in Finland
Canadian expatriate ice hockey players in Germany
Canadian expatriate ice hockey players in Italy
Canadian expatriate ice hockey players in Slovenia
Canadian expatriate ice hockey players in Sweden
Canadian expatriate ice hockey players in the United States
Canadian ice hockey defencemen
Cincinnati Cyclones (IHL) players
Cincinnati Mighty Ducks players
Fehérvár AV19 players
Florida Everblades players
HC Merano players
HC TPS players
HDD Olimpija Ljubljana players
Ice hockey people from Alberta
Kölner Haie players
Lowell Lock Monsters players
Pensacola Ice Pilots players
Pittsburgh Penguins draft picks
Portland Winterhawks players
Prince Albert Raiders players
Red Deer Rebels players
Regina Pats players
Seattle Thunderbirds players
Springfield Falcons players
Tingsryds AIF players
Toledo Storm players
Vienna Capitals players